Sheena, Queen of the Jungle, is a fictional American comic book jungle girl heroine, originally published primarily by Fiction House during the Golden Age of Comic Books. She was the first female comic book character with her own title, with her 1941 premiere issue (cover-dated Spring 1942) preceding Wonder Woman #1 (cover-dated Summer 1942). Sheena inspired a wealth of similar comic book jungle queens. She was predated in literature by Rima, the Jungle Girl, introduced in the 1904 William Henry Hudson novel Green Mansions.

An orphan who grew up in the jungle, learning how to survive and thrive there, she possesses the ability to communicate with wild animals and is proficient in fighting with knives, spears, bows, and makeshift weapons. Her adventures mostly involve encounters with slave traders, white hunters, native Africans, and wild animals.

Publication history

Fiction House 
Sheena debuted in Joshua B. Power's British magazine Wags #46 in January 1938. She was created by Will Eisner and S. M. "Jerry" Iger. One source says Iger, through his small studio Universal Phoenix Features (UFP), commissioned Mort Meskin to produce prototype drawings of Sheena. UFP was one of a handful of studios that produced comics on demand for publishers and syndicates, and whose client Editors Press Service distributed the feature to Wags. To help hide the fact their studio consisted only of themselves, the duo signed their Sheena strip with the pseudonym "W. Morgan Thomas". Eisner said an inspiration for the character's name was H. Rider Haggard's 1886 jungle-goddess novel She. Iger, who maintained that Eisner had nothing to do with the creation of the character, claimed that he picked the name because his mind wandered to the derogatory name "sheenies" that Jewish people were sometimes called in his early days in New York.

Sheena first appeared stateside in Fiction House's Jumbo Comics #1, and subsequently in every issue (Sept. 1938 – April 1953), as well as in her groundbreaking 18-issue spin-off, Sheena, Queen of the Jungle (Spring 1942 – Winter 1952), the first comic book to title-star a female character. Sheena also appeared in Fiction House's Ka'a'nga #16 (Summer 1952) and the one-shot 3-D Sheena, Jungle Queen (1953)—the latter reprinted by Eclipse Comics as Sheena 3-D (January 1985) and by Blackthorne Publishing as Sheena 3-D Special (May 1985). Blackthorne also published Jerry Iger's Classic Sheena (April 1985). 

Fiction House, originally a pulp magazine publisher, ran prose stories of its star heroine in the latter-day pulp one-shot Stories of Sheena, Queen of the Jungle (Spring 1951) and Jungle Stories vol. 5 #11 (Spring 1954).

Contemporary appearances 
Blackthorne in the 1980s published original Sheena stories in the three-issue series Jungle Comics (May–Oct. 1988). A reboot of Sheena written primarily by Steven E. de Souza and set in South America rather than Africa, began with London Night Studios in 1998, and continued at Devil's Due Publishing from 2008–2009, and at Moonstone in 2014. London Night Studios published Sheena, Queen of the Jungle #0 (February 1998), a one-shot color comic book, followed by three issues of a planned four-issue black-and-white miniseries  of the same name (May 1998 – February 1999). Devils Due Publishing releases include Sheena, Queen of the Jungle #1–5 (June 2007 – January 2008), a Sheena, Trail of the Mapinguari one-shot (April 2008), and Sheena, Queen of the Jungle: Dark Rising #1–3 (October 2008 – December 2008). Moonstone published Sheena, Queen of the Jungle #1–3 (2014). Additionally, AC Comics publishes Sheena reprints as well as new stories of the jungle femmes that followed in her wake.

Dynamite Entertainment 
Dynamite began publishing Sheena comics in 2017. Co-written by Marguerite Bennett and Christina Trujilo, with art by Moritat (issues 1-4) and Maria Laura Sanapo (issues 5-10), it ran for ten issues. A special 25¢ issue 0 preview comic surpassed 100,000 pre-orders. A new Sheena comic series came out in November 2021. It is written by Stephen Mooney and drawn by artist Jethro Morales.

Fictional character biography 
Sheena is the young, blonde daughter of Cardwell Rivington, who is exploring in Africa with his daughter in tow. When Cardwell dies from accidentally drinking a magic potion made by Koba, a native witch doctor, Sheena is orphaned. Koba raises the young girl as his daughter, teaching her the ways of the jungle and various central African languages. The adult Sheena becomes "queen of the jungle" and acquires a monkey sidekick named Chim.

According to Jess Nevins' Encyclopedia of Golden Age Superheroes, "Assisted by the great white hunter Bob Reynolds, Sheena fights everything under the sun, including but not limited to: hostile natives, hostile animals, giants, a super-ape, the Green Terror, sabre-tooth tigers, voodoo cultists, gorilla-men, devil-apes, blood cults, devil queens, dinosaurs, army ants, lion men, lost races, leopard-birds, cavemen, serpent gods, vampire-apes, etc."

Originally costumed in a simple red dress, by issue #10 of Jumbo Comics Sheena acquired her iconic leopard-skin outfit.

In time, Sheena's home village is destroyed, leaving Sheena with a white safari guide named Bob Reynolds (alternately called "Bob Reilly" or "Bob Rayburn"), who becomes her mate. In later incarnations, Sheena's mate is Rick Thorne.

In the 2007 remake set in South America, Sheena's real name is Rachel Cardwell, daughter of Tony and Ramona Cardwell.

Reception
Sheena was ranked 59th in Comics Buyer's Guides "100 Sexiest Women in Comics" list.

In other media

Model Irish McCalla portrayed the titular character in Sheena: Queen of the Jungle, a 26-episode TV series, aired in first-run syndication from 1955 to 1956. McCalla told a newspaper interviewer she was discovered by Nassour Studios while throwing a bamboo spear on a Malibu, California beach, famously adding "I couldn't act, but I could swing through the trees." Although the Sheena character was often called "the Queen of the Congo," the TV series clearly located her in Kenya, which is hundreds of miles from the Congo River. Though the character was created in comic books by Will Eisner and Jerry Iger many years earlier, a 1956 New York Times obituary for Claude E. Lapham, a 10-year editor at Fiction House, says, "His story 'Sheena' was the basis for the television story of that name."

The 1984 Columbia Pictures film, Sheena, produced by Paul Aratow, starred Tanya Roberts, who had previously co-starred as Kiri in MGM's 1982 film Beastmaster. In this version, Sheena's real name is Janet Ames, daughter of Philip and Betsy Ames. Roberts's Sheena had a much-expanded vocabulary from McCalla's (as well as a telepathic connection with jungle animals). Marvel Comics published a comic-book adaptation of the Sheena film as Marvel Comics Super Special #34 (June 1984), reprinting it as Sheena, Queen of the Jungle #1–2 (Dec. 1984–Feb. 1985).

The Bollywood film industry in India produced a string of uncredited Hindi versions of Sheena, beginning with Tarzan Sundari, also known as Lady Tarzan (1983); Africadalli Sheela (1986); and Jungle Ki Beti (1988).

Sheena was revived by Hearst Entertainment in October 2000, portrayed by Gena Lee Nolin. In this version, Sheena's real name is Shirley Hamilton. Sheena was given a new power in this 35-episode Columbia/TriStar series: the ability to adopt the form of any warm-blooded animal once she gazed into its eyes. She was also depicted as a ferocious killer, capable of becoming a humanoid creature called the Darak'Na; this form killed numerous individuals, though in her regular form she was also seen in numerous episodes stabbing soldiers and other villains to death. As with Tanya Roberts, Nolin's Sheena spoke whole sentences.

In 2017, Millennium Films was developing a Sheena reboot.

The Ramones song "Sheena Is a Punk Rocker" was inspired by Sheena, Queen of the Jungle. The song first appeared on the band's third album, Rocket to Russia, in 1977. A cartoon drawing of Sheena appears on the record sleeve of the LP version.

The Bruce Springsteen song "Crush on You" contains the lyrics "She makes the Venus de Milo look like she got no style/she makes Sheena of the Jungle look meek and mild."

Ike Turner credited Sheena, Queen of the Jungle as one of his inspirations for creating Tina Turner's stage persona. He chose the name "Tina" because it rhymed with "Sheena."

References

External links

 

American comics characters
1938 comics debuts
Comics characters introduced in 1937
Characters created by Will Eisner
AC Comics titles
Blackthorne Publishing titles
Devil's Due Publishing titles
Eclipse Comics titles
Marvel Comics titles
Dynamite Entertainment characters
Fictional therianthropes
Fictional activists
Fictional archers
Fictional queens
Fictional explorers
Fictional hunters
Fictional knife-fighters
Fictional orphans
Fictional polearm and spearfighters
Female soldier and warrior characters in comics
Jungle (genre) comics
Jungle girls
Jungle superheroes
1955 American television series debuts
1955 American television series endings
American adventure television series
American comics adapted into films
Comics adapted into television series
Comics about women
Female characters in comics
Golden Age comics titles
Golden Age adventure heroes